Bruce A. Ware (born September 30, 1953) is an American theologian, former president of the Evangelical Theological Society, and a key figure in the debate over open theism.

Education
A.S. (1973) Judson Baptist College
Certif. (1974) Capernwray Bible School
B.A. (1975) Whitworth College
M.Div. (1978) and Th.M. (1980) Western Conservative Baptist Seminary
M.A. (1981) University of Washington
Ph.D. (1984) Fuller Theological Seminary

Career
Bethel Theological Seminary (1984 - 1987)
Western Seminary
Associate Professor and Chairman of the Department of Biblical and Systematic Theology at Trinity Evangelical Divinity School
Professor of Christian Theology at the Southern Baptist Theological Seminary (1998–present)

Works

Books
 
 
 
 
 
Serving God with Determined Faith: Studies in the Book of Nehemiah (2005)

as Editor

Articles and Chapters
 
 
 
 
 
 
 "Unity and Distinction of the Trinitarian Persons." In Whtifield, Keith S. (ed.) Trinitarian Theology: Theological Models and Doctrinal Application. Nashville, TN: B&H Academic. 2018. pp. 17–62.

References

External links
Faculty page at Southern Seminary

Living people
1953 births
Southern Baptist Theological Seminary faculty
Trinity Evangelical Divinity School alumni
Western Seminary alumni
Fuller Theological Seminary alumni
American Baptist theologians